The Gay and Lesbian Association of Choruses ("GALA Choruses") is an international association of LGBT choruses founded in 1982. In its inaugural performance 14 choruses performed together in September 1982 in San Francisco as part of the first Gay Games. It aims to foster artistic and organizational development within its member choruses. The association includes almost 10,000 vocalists in over 100 associated choruses singing as male, female and mixed ensembles in a wide variety of styles. GALA Choruses produces a large festival every four years, in addition to a number of smaller annual workshops and conferences.

Festivals
Artistic and business directors of the choruses then in existence envisioned both the San Francisco and New York City events at the first planning meeting in Chicago, Illinois (15–17 May 1981) that set the course for the official founding of GALA Choruses.

1982 - San Francisco, California
1983 - New York, New York
1986 - Minneapolis, Minnesota
1989 - Seattle, Washington - about 2,500 delegates
1992 - Denver, Colorado - over 3,400 delegates
1996 - Tampa, Florida - over 4,700 delegates
2000 - San Jose, California - over 4,700 delegates
2004 - Place des Arts, Montreal, Quebec - over 5,700 delegates
2008 - Adrienne Arsht Center for the Performing Arts, Miami, Florida
2012 - Denver Performing Arts Complex, Denver, Colorado - over 6,000 delegates
2016 - Denver Performing Arts Complex, Denver, Colorado 
2024 - (scheduled)

Notes
The San Francisco event was called the West Coast Choral Festival. Members of the San Francisco Gay Men's Chorus organized and ran this event as a forerunner to the larger event planned the following year in New York City.
The New York event was called COAST, which stood for Come Out and Sing Together. It was organized and run by members of the New York City Gay Men's Chorus.
First GALA festival in which a women's chorus, Denver Women's Chorus, performed
Out of forty-four choruses, eight were women's choruses; eleven were mixed choruses
The 2020 Festival was canceled due to the ongoing COVID-19 pandemic.

Notable member choruses

Anna Crusis Women's Choir
Atlanta Gay Men's Chorus
Beijing Queer Chorus
Bridging Voices Youth Chorus
Chicago Gay Men's Chorus
Columbus Gay Men's Chorus
Connecticut Gay Men's Chorus
Coro Allegro
Diverse Harmony Youth Chorus
GAPA Men's Chorus - San Francisco, CA
Gay Men's Chorus of Los Angeles
Gay Men's Chorus of San Diego
Gay Men's Chorus of Washington, D.C.
Golden Gate Men's Chorus - San Francisco, CA
Heartland Men's Chorus - Kansas City, MO
Lesbian/Gay Chorus of San Francisco
New York City Gay Men's Chorus
Oakland Gay Men's Chorus
One Voice Mixed Chorus - Minneapolis/St. Paul, MN
Philadelphia Gay Men's Chorus
Portland Gay Men's Chorus
San Diego Men's Chorus
San Francisco Gay Men's Chorus
Seattle Men's Chorus
Turtle Creek Chorale - Dallas, TX
Twin Cities Gay Men's Chorus - Minneapolis/St. Paul, MN
Vancouver Men's Chorus

References

External links
GALA Choruses official site
The History & Music of the Gay & Lesbian Choral Movement
Queer Quires: listing LGBTI choirs worldwide

LGBT choruses
Music organizations based in the United States
Choral societies
Musical groups established in 1982
 
1982 establishments in California